A cyclopropyl group is a chemical structure derived from cyclopropane, and can participate in organic reactions that constitute cycloadditions and rearrangement organic reactions of cyclopropane. The group has an empirical formula of C3H5 and chemical bonds from each of the three carbons to both of the other two.

Structure and bonding 
Due to the unfavoured bond angles (60°), cyclopropyl groups are highly strained. Two orbital models were proposed to describe the bonding situation. The Coulson-Moffit model uses bent bonds. The C-C bonds are formed by overlap of two sp-hybrid orbitals. To adapt to the small bond angle, there is some rehybridization resulting in sp~5-hybrids for the ring bonds and sp~2 for the C-H bonds. This model resembles the banana bond model for C=C double bonds (τ bonds).

Alternatively the structure can be explained with the Walsh model. Here the two sp-hybrids forming the ring bond are separated into one sp2-hybrid and one pure p-orbital. This corresponds to the π bond description of C=C double bonds.

Cyclopropyl groups are good donors in hyperconjugation resulting in a considerable stabilization of carbocations. In contrast to double bonds, stabilization of radicals is weaker and stabilization of carbanions is negligible. This is explained by the occupation of the π system with two more electrons, making the cyclopropyl methyl cation's HOMO isolobal to the allyl anion's HOMO.

References

Functional groups
Cyclopropanes